Third-seeded Zsuzsi Körmöczy defeated Shirley Bloomer 6–4, 1–6, 6–2 in the final to win the women's singles tennis title at the 1958 French Championships.

Seeds
The seeded players are listed below. Zsuzsi Körmöczy is the champion; others show the round in which they were eliminated.

  Shirley Bloomer (finalist)
  Lorraine Coghlan (third round)
  Zsuzsi Körmöczy (champion)
  Vera Puzejova (third round)
  Dorothy Knode (quarterfinals)
  Ann Haydon (quarterfinals)
  Heather Segal (semifinals)
  Mary Hawton (second round)
  Christiane Mercelis (second round)
  Thelma Long (third round)
  Silvana Lazzarino (second round)
  Yola Ramírez (third round)
  Maria Esther Bueno (semifinals)
  Karol Fageros (second round)
  Christine Truman (quarterfinals)
  Márta Peterdy (third round)

Draw

Key
 Q = Qualifier
 WC = Wild card
 LL = Lucky loser
 r = Retired

Finals

Earlier rounds

Section 1

Section 2

Section 3

Section 4

References

External links
   on the French Open website

1958 in women's tennis
1958
1958 in French women's sport
1958 in French tennis